Kindle is a surname. Notable people with the surname include:

Greg Kindle (born 1950), American player of gridiron football
Hermann Kindle (born 1935), skier from Liechtenstein
Nicola Kindle (born 1991), skier from Liechtenstein
Sergio Kindle (born 1987), American football player